Owen/Into It. Over It. Split EP is a split album between Owen and Into It. Over It. This split features an original song from each band, as well as each band covering a song from the opposite artist. Into It. Over It. covers "Poor Souls," which can be found on Owen's 2002 full-length No Good For No One Now, and recreates it into an even more soft and sad song. Owen's cover of "Anchor," from Into It. Over It.'s album 52 Weeks, brings out a punky edge.

Track listing

Personnel
Owen
 Mike Kinsella – vocals, guitar, acoustic guitar, bass, piano, drums

Into It. Over It.
 Evan Thomas Weiss – vocals, guitar, bass, keyboards
 Nick Wakim – drums

Production
 Neil Strauch – engineering, mixing
 David Downham – mastering
 Andy Hendricks – layout
 Ryan Russell- photography

References

External links 
 

2015 EPs
Owen (musician) EPs
Split EPs
Polyvinyl Record Co. EPs